Vilasavilli is a village in Uppalaguptam Mandal, Dr. B.R. Ambedkar Konaseema district in the state of Andhra Pradesh in India.

Geography 

Demographics 
 India census, Vilasavilli had a population of 4010, out of which 2007 were male and 2003 were female. The population of children below 6 years of age was 9%. The literacy rate of the village was 77%.

References 

Villages in Uppalaguptam mandal